Harry Gill may refer to:

 Harry Gill (RAF officer) (1922–2008), British World War II fighter pilot and air vice-marshal
 Harry Gill (architect) (1858–1925), English architect
 Harry Gill (gymnast) (born 1881), British Olympic gymnast
 Harry Gill (politician) (1885–1955), British Member of Parliament
 Harry Pelling Gill (1855–1916), English-born Australian artist and art teacher